²¹

BA CityFlyer operates scheduled and charter flights to the following destinations as of December 2020:

List

Scheduled destinations

Charter destinations
BA CityFlyer operates a number of weekend routes from regional airports as well as a program of charter flights on behalf of a number of tour operators:

Terminated destinations

References

Lists of airline destinations
Oneworld affiliate destinations